Paul Nogier (3 July 1908 – 15 May 1996) was a French neurologist and physician who invented auriculotherapy", a version of acupuncture, which is a pseudoscientific practice.

Nogier's discoveries

Auriculotherapy
In 1957, Nogier first presented his observations of the somatotopic correspondences of the ear, in which the external ear anatomically corresponds to an inverted fetus—the homunculus.

Nogier's pulse
Nogier claimed that there was a change in the amplitude and dimension of the patient's radial pulse when certain points on the auricle were stimulated. He called this the Nogier's pulse or Vascular Automonic Sign (VAS).

Nogier's frequencies
In the 1970s, Nogier developed seven frequencies A through G which he routinely used in medical practice for detection and treatment. In his practice, these frequencies are preferentially recognized by the body, so they enter into resonance to exert effects on the body.

See also
Auriculotherapy

References

French neurologists
1908 births
1996 deaths